The United Kingdom held a national preselection to choose the song that would go to the Eurovision Song Contest 1971.

Before Eurovision

A Song for Europe 1971 
The show was held on 20 February 1971 as part of the BBC1 TV series It's Cliff Richard! and was presented by Cliff Richard. Clodagh Rodgers, a singer and actress from Northern Ireland, best known for her hit singles including, 1969 hits "Come Back and Shake Me" and "Goodnight Midnight" sang all the six finalists in the contest, having been chosen by the BBC to represent the UK, in part due to worries as to what reaction the UK artist would face at the contest in Dublin. Rodgers performed the songs weekly, before showcasing all six in the Song for Europe edition of the Cliff Richard Show, where they were also immediately repeated. Due to a postal strike, viewers were unable to cast votes for the songs this year, so 8 regional juries, consisting of 10 jurors with just one vote each for their favourite song, were constructed from members of the public. These juries were located in Belfast, Birmingham, Bristol, Cardiff, Glasgow, London, Manchester & Norwich.

Chart success 
"Jack in the Box" was chosen as the winning song, with two songs tying for second place. Rodgers released two standard 7-inch singles of the winner, with one of the runners-up "Someone to Love Me" or "Wind of Change" on the B-Sides. She also released a three-track maxi single which included both the second placed songs. The combined sales of the three singles (which all shared the catalogue number RCA2066) reached No.4 in the UK singles chart; Rodgers last top 10 single in the UK. Later in the year, she released a fourth song from the final "Look Left, Look Right", together with the three already released tracks on the LP Rodgers and Heart. "Another Time, Another Place" was then included on the 1972 budget LP Clodagh Rodgers, after it had become a No.13 hit single for Engelbert Humperdinck. To date, only the last place song "In My World of Beautiful Things" has never been officially released in any form.

At Eurovision
"Jack in the Box" won the national and went on to come 4th in the contest.

For the performance in Dublin, Rodgers wore a pink frilly top and spangled hot pants. She finished in fourth place, behind Monaco, Spain and Germany. It was the first time since 1966 that the UK had not placed first or second.

Radio 1 DJ Dave Lee Travis provided the BBC Television commentary, whilst Terry Wogan began his long running commitments with the Eurovision, providing the radio commentary for BBC Radio 1 listeners and he would commentate for both radio and television for most years until .

Voting

References

1971
Countries in the Eurovision Song Contest 1971
Eurovision
Eurovision